Chondrilla nucula, sometimes called the Caribbean chicken-liver sponge, is a species of sea sponge belonging to the family Chondrillidae.

It is an amorphous shaped sponge that grows in flat, sometimes bulbous sheets in benthic communities. It is sometimes found in marginal, stressful systems such as caves.  Such sponges are white, lacking access to sunlight, and photosymbionts. It is known to be preyed upon by the hawksbill turtle, Eretmochelys imbricata.

This sponge has been found to contain strains of bacteria that contained antimicrobial properties. These properties have been shown to inhibit certain bacteria which are harmful to human including Staphylococcus aureus.

References

Tetractinomorpha
Taxa named by Eduard Oscar Schmidt